Football Club Marmande 47 is a French football club founded in 1946.

Past players 

Farid El Alagui
Marouane Chamakh
 Jérôme Lebouc
 Sloan Privat

References

External links 
 Official Site

Sport in Lot-et-Garonne
Football clubs in Nouvelle-Aquitaine
1946 establishments in France
Association football clubs established in 1946